The California Science Center (sometimes spelled California ScienCenter) is a state agency and museum located in Exposition Park, Los Angeles, next to the Natural History Museum of Los Angeles County and the University of Southern California. Billed as the West Coast's largest hands-on science center, the California Science Center is a public-private partnership between the State of California and the California Science Center Foundation. The California Natural Resources Agency oversees the California Science Center and the California African American Museum.
Founded in 1951 as the "California Museum of Science and Industry", the Museum was remodeled and renamed in 1998 as the "California Science Center". The California Science Center hosts the California State Science Fair annually.

Admission includes access to the permanent exhibits, such as the Space Shuttle Endeavour and other prominent aircraft and spacecraft, and to various demonstrations. A separate ticket is required for the IMAX movies, most special traveling exhibitions, and special activities that include a climbing wall, motion simulator, and a high-wire bicycle.

Affiliations
The center has been accredited by the American Alliance of Museums and the Association of Zoos and Aquariums, and is a member of the Association of Science and Technology Centers. The museum is also an affiliate in the Smithsonian Affiliations program.

Current permanent exhibits

Ecosystems
The two-story, 45,000-square-foot exhibit features display zones with live animals and aquariums about wildlife and adaptation in different ecosystems, including a river, desert, polar region, deep sea, ocean, island and urban areas, as well as the entire planet Earth.

Creative World
An area with hands-on activities and exhibits that explore innovation and invention, with themes involving construction, energy and transportation.

World of Life
Examines the processes of life and similarities among organisms, including food, body organs like the heart and brain, senses, defenses against threats, how living things reproduce which includes a hatching chick display, DNA, and microscopic organisms.

A titan arum (Amorphophallus titanum) flower is now on loan from the Huntington Library, Art Museum and Botanical Gardens.

The World of Life exhibit was the home of Tess, the 50 foot human body simulator that would discuss how homeostasis keeps our bodies in balance. It ran fron the science centers opening up until its closure in 2023.

Space exhibits

 Mercury-Redstone 2 capsule which carried Ham, a chimpanzee, the first great ape in space (1961)
 Gemini 11 capsule, flown by Pete Conrad and Richard F. Gordon Jr. in 1966
 Apollo-Soyuz Test Project Command Module from the 1975 mission
 Space Shuttle Endeavour in the Samuel Oschin Pavilion
Space Shuttle external tank immediately outside the Oschin Pavilion
 SKETCH Foundation Gallery in Science Court - exhibits about the Solar System, space travel and aviation, displays of historic aircraft, space vehicles and equipment, and space telescopes

Aircraft
Douglas DC-8 jetliner
Lockheed F-104D Starfighter
Lockheed A-12 Oxcart two-seater trainer, Serial Number 60-6927 “Titanium Goose”
Replica Bell X-1 (movie prop from The Right Stuff)
1902 Wright Glider replica
1929 Velie Monocoupe
Northrop T-38 Talon Jet Trainer, Serial Number 58-1196
Northrop F-20 Tigershark
McDonnell Douglas F/A-18A Hornet Serial Number 161725

Robotic spacecraft
Engineering prototype for Viking Lander
Cassini-Huygens planetary probe (replica)
Pioneer 10 planetary probe (replica)
Mariner IV planetary probe (replica) 
Pioneer-Venus planetary probe (replica)

History

State Exhibition
The museum's history dates back to the first California State Exhibition building, which opened in Exposition Park in Los Angeles in 1912, the site of an agricultural fairground from 1872 to 1910. The brick and terra cotta building, designed by William D. Coates, Jr., state architect, and N. Ellery, state engineer, displayed agriculturally-based natural resources and industrial products from across the state, including ranching, fish and game, coal mining, gold mining, oil production, and lumbering, as well as some of the state's recreational attractions.  After World War II, the building also featured exhibits about state science and technology industries.

California Museum of Science and Industry
In 1951, the exhibition became the "California Museum of Science and Industry". The State Exhibition building was renamed in honor of major donor and trustee Howard F. Ahmanson as the Howard F. Ahmanson Building. The hands-on interactive exhibits included themes on agriculture, transportation, electricity, energy, industries, and minerals.

In 1961, the museum opened a new science wing that featured "Mathematica: A World of Numbers... and Beyond", an exhibit sponsored by IBM and designed by Charles and Ray Eames to visually demonstrate fundamental mathematical concepts. Interaction stations demonstrated different concepts including celestial mechanics, the Möbius strip, multiplication, symmetry, and projective geometry. The original exhibit closed in 1998, and is now on display at the New York Hall of Science.

The Hall of Health was added in 1968.

1984 changes
In preparation for the 1984 Summer Olympics, the museum added new exhibits on earthquakes and economics, and an IMAX theatre. The opening and closing ceremonies for the games were held in the Los Angeles Memorial Coliseum, which is adjacent to the museum.

California African American Museum
The California African American Museum was founded in 1981 and housed in the California Museum of Science and Industry building until 1984, when its own facility was opened adjacent to the California Aerospace Museum.

1990s and closing
In 1994, the museum's building was damaged by the Northridge earthquake. The California Museum of Science and Industry closed in 1996 to prepare for a new facility.

California Aerospace Museum

The "California Aerospace Museum" was also opened in 1984 adjacent to and operated by the California Museum of Science and Industry to coincide with the Summer Olympics. It was also known as Aerospace Hall but also commonly known as the California Air and Space Museum/Gallery and the SKETCH Foundation Gallery, and was the first major public work of architect Frank Gehry.  The museum focused on the State's history as a leader in the aviation and aerospace industries and featured a giant, hangar-like space with aircraft and space vehicles and artifacts.

The building, now known as the Air and Space Gallery, was closed in 2011. In 2012 the building was listed on the California Register of Historical Resources, but its future is unknown.

Transformation to California Science Center
In 1988 the museum's leadership began a to develop a three-phase, 25-year master plan to transform the institution from a science museum to a science education facility. This new facility would be known as the California Science Center. The original museum building closed its doors in 1996 to prepare for the new construction.

Phase I

The new construction was designed by Portland, Oregon-based Zimmer Gunsul Frasca Partnership. Changes included:

 Redesign of the original main building (Howard F. Ahmanson building). The north facade of the Science Center retains the facade of former State Exposition Building that opened to the Exposition Park Rose Garden, but the remainder of the original building was demolished.
 Science Plaza - Exhibits outside the main entrance of aircraft and science principles.
 Exhibits in the new building
 World of Life - Explores the science of life in five galleries.
 Creative World - Highlights technology in transportation, communications and structures. Features include a virtual reality exhibit to play sports using virtual reality and an earthquake simulator.
 Special Exhibits gallery - Exhibits in this room have included a Titanic exhibit, a magic exhibit, a toy exhibit, and the Human Body exhibit.
 ExploraStore - Store specializing in scientific and educational items.
 IMAX theater - a new seven-story IMAX screen

Phase I was completed and opened in 1998, when the museum was opened and officially renamed the California Science Center.

Phase II
 Ecosystems - opened in 2010
 Renovated the historic 160th Regiment State Armory building into the new "Wallis Annenberg Building for Science Learning and Innovation", opened in 2004 The building includes the Amgen Center for Science Learning and the K-5 Science Center School, a public magnet school officially  known as the Dr. Theodore T. Alexander Jr. Science Center School.
 SKETCH Foundation Gallery, Air and Space Exhibits - opened in 2002, a temporary gallery featuring interactive exhibits and artifacts on continuing loan from NASA and The Smithsonian Institution.
 Air and Space Gallery (former California Aerospace Museum) closed in 2011, with displays moved into the main Science Center in the SKETCH Foundation Gallery.
 In 2012, the California Science Center opened a temporary steel structure known as the "Samuel Oschin Pavilion" to house the Space Shuttle Endeavour. The structure was designed by Zimmer Gunsul Frasca Partnership and is planned to be replaced by the new Samuel Oschin Air and Space Center on the east side of the Science Center. In 2015, the museum received the last remaining Space Shuttle external tank.

Phase III
Samuel Oschin Air and Space Center - planned to open in 2025, the  addition was formerly titled "Worlds Beyond". The ZGF designed addition is currently under construction. It will house a total of 150 new exhibits, including the permanent home of the Space Shuttle Endeavour. The center will include a shuttle gallery, which will permanently house Space Shuttle Endeavour, an air gallery that will house 20 airplanes, and a space gallery.

Gallery

See also
 List of most-visited museums in the United States
Mathematica: A World of Numbers... and Beyond
Exposition Park (Los Angeles)

References

Further reading

External links

usc.edu Brief story about the California Museum of Science and Industry
CMSI Remembering the California Museum of Science & Industry
EHDD Architecture Phase II architects

Museums in Los Angeles
Exposition Park (Los Angeles)
Aerospace museums in California
Science museums in California
History museums in California
IMAX venues
Science centers
Space Shuttle tourist attractions
Science and technology in Greater Los Angeles
California Natural Resources Agency
Science Center, California
Smithsonian Institution affiliates
Institutions accredited by the American Alliance of Museums
Association of Science-Technology Centers member institutions
Museums established in 1951
1951 establishments in California
Expressionist architecture
South Los Angeles
Exposition Park (Los Angeles neighborhood)
Postmodern architecture in California